The R307 is a Regional Route in South Africa that connects the R27 north of Melkbosstrand with the R45 south-west of Moorreesburg.

From its southern origin at the R27, it heads north-east to Atlantis. Here it meets a north-north-west / south-south-east road at a t-junction. The south-south-east section is signed as the R304, but the north-north-westerly route continues as the R307. This road passes through Mamre and then receives the R315 from the east. The two roads are co-signed and continue to Darling. Leaving the R315 again diverges, heading west, whereas the R307 now heads north-east. It ends at the R45.

References

External links
 Routes Travel Info

Regional Routes in the Western Cape